Manuel Alarcon Reina (February 19, 1941 – May 29, 1998) was a Cuban baseball player.

In 1964–1965, he became the first pitcher in the history of the league to strike out more than 100 batters in a season, striking out 101 in 94.2 innings. On January 24, in the 1966–1967 season, he threw the third no-hitter in Cuban National Series history. He won the Cuban National Series Most Valuable Pitcher award that season.

Biography
He was born in Bartolomé Masó, Cuba and died in Havana, Cuba. He pitched for the Orientales in the Cuban National Series for seven years in the 1960s. He posted a win-loss record of 41-24 and an ERA of 1.82 ERA in 87 games, 70 of which he started. He also threw 43 complete games and 12 shutouts.

He also pitched in the 1963 Pan American Games and the 1967 Pan American Games.

References

1941 births
1998 deaths
Cuban baseball players
Pan American Games gold medalists for Cuba
Pan American Games silver medalists for Cuba
Pan American Games medalists in baseball
Baseball players at the 1963 Pan American Games
Medalists at the 1963 Pan American Games
Medalists at the 1967 Pan American Games